Central Jail Faisalabad is a jail in Faisalabad, Pakistan located on Jaranwala road nearly  east of Faisalabad city.

History
The jail was built in 1967 and formally inaugurated on 1st day of July 1971. It was constructed with a view to confine long-term prisoners of Faisalabad Region (except Mianwali and adjoining districts) and to function as Headquarter Jail for subordinate Jail staffers of the region. After creation of four regions of jails in the province of Punjab stationed at Lahore, Rawalpindi, Multan and Faisalabad, the role of Headquarter Jail has been shifted from the Superintendent of Central / Headquarter Jail Faisalabad to the regional Deputy Inspector General of Prisons in the year 2004.

Family Rooms
A scheme for construction of Family Rooms, an entirely new concept in Pakistan, for long-term convicted prisoners at larger jails including Central Jail Faisalabad was initiated in the year 2006. After completion of these Family Rooms, the prisoners sentenced to life imprisonment and other long-term inmates will be facilitated to keep their wives with them for three days once in every quarter of a year. The facility shall be provided subject to verification of the good conduct of the prisoner and their family members by the jail authorities, the District administration and the concerned police.

Prison industries
The following prison industries are functioning in the jail to train the convicted prisoners in various trades and handicrafts so that they can earn a living after their release, utilise prison labour for the profit of the state exchequer, and keep the prisoners busy in useful tasks.

 Jail Warden Uniform Tailoring / Stitching Unit
 Prisoner Chadar Weaving Unit
 Hospital Bed Sheet Weaving Unit
 Hospital Patients' Blanket Weaving Unit
 Carpet Knitting Unit
 Phenyle Manufacturing Unit

There are 1,826 convicted prisoners at the jail, of which 428 have been sentenced to death. Of the 1,082 prisoners under trial, 682 are employed in prison industry.

Gallery

See also
 Government of Punjab, Pakistan
 Headquarter Jail
 National Academy for Prisons Administration
 Prison Officer
 Punjab Prisons (Pakistan)
 Punjab Prisons Staff Training Institute

References

External links

Prisons in Pakistan